was a Japanese martial artist and teacher of Bujinkan founder Masaaki Hatsumi. He has been called "The Last Shinobi" by Bujinkan instructor Wolfgang Ettig.

Biography
Toshitsugu (Chosui) Takamatsu was born on 10 March 1889 (the 23rd year of Meiji) in Akashi, Hyōgo Prefecture. Also known as Mōko no Tora (蒙古の虎 Mongolian Tiger), he is attributed as a martial arts master by members of the Bujinkan organization. Hatsumi reports that Takamatsu traveled through Mongolia to China at the age of 21, teaching martial arts and fighting a number of life or death battles. He was married to Uno Tane. They adopted a girl named Yoshiko. His father (Takamatsu Gishin Yasaburo) owned a match-factory and received Dai-Ajari (Master) title in Kumano Shugendo (a type of Shingon Buddhism). His dojo was named "Sakushin" (Cultivating Spirit). His house was in front of Kashihara Shrine in Kashihara, Nara. Takamatsu died on 2 April 1972 of illness. His inheritor was Masaaki Hatsumi who founded the Bujinkan system and its art of Bujinkan Budo Taijutsu.

Ninjutsu lineage
Takamatsu's claim to lineage in ninjutsu has been disputed by a few individuals. The 1963 version of the Bugei Ryūha Daijiten indicates of Takamatsu's Togakure-ryu: "this genealogy refers to various written records and oral transmissions and there are many points/places where embellishments have been added and people appearing in the genealogy are also made older than they actually are. Thus the genealogy can be considered to be something that [Takamatsu's teacher Toda] Shinryūken newly arranged around the end of the Tokugawa shōgunate." The Iga-ryū Ninja Museum lists Jinichi Kawakami as the only legitimate inheritor of authentic ninjutsu although this is likely to be a biased opinion as Jinichi Kawakami is also the honorary director of the Iga-ryū Ninja Museum, a commercial enterprise and tourist attraction. According to martial arts author Donn Draeger "The late Fujita Seiko was the last of the living ninja, having served in assignments for the Imperial Government during the Taisho and Showa eras. Modern authorities such as T. Hatsumi are responsible for most research being done on ninjutsu."

References

External links
The Takamatsu-sensei Photo Page
Toshitsugu Takamatsu is the 33rd Togakure-ryu Patriarch of Ninjutsu and master of as many as 8 styles of Bujutsu and Ninjutsu.

1889 births
1972 deaths
Sportspeople from Hyōgo Prefecture
Japanese ninjutsu practitioners
People from Akashi, Hyōgo